The Puhoi River is a river of the Auckland Region of New Zealand's North Island.

See also
List of rivers of New Zealand

References

External links
Photographs of Puhoi River held in Auckland Libraries' heritage collections.

Rivers of the Auckland Region
Rivers of New Zealand
Hauraki Gulf catchment